This is a list of active German Navy ships as of 2022. There are approximately 65 ships in commission including; 11 frigates, 5 corvettes, 2 minesweepers, 10 minehunters, 6 submarines, 11 replenishment ships and 20 miscellaneous auxiliary vessels.

Submarine fleet

Surface fleet

Auxiliary fleet
{|class="wikitable" style="margin:auto; width:100%;"
|-
! style="text-align:left; width:20%;"|Class
! style="text-align:left; width:0%;"|Picture
! style="text-align:left; width:20%;"|Type
! style="text-align:left; width:20%;"|Ships
! style="text-align:left; width:5%;"|No.
! style="text-align:left; width:5%;"|Comm.
! style="text-align:left; width:10%;"|Displacement 
! style="text-align:left; width:20%;"|Note

|-
! colspan="8" style="background: lavender;"| Replenishment (11 in service)
|-
!rowspan="3"| Berlin
|rowspan="3"| 
|rowspan="3"| Replenishment oiler
| Berlin
| A1411 
| 2001
|rowspan="3"| 20,240 tonnes
|rowspan="3"| 
|-
| Frankfurt am Main
| A1412 
| 2002
|-
| Bonn
| A1413 
| 2013
|-
!rowspan="2"| Rhön
|rowspan="2"| 
|rowspan="2"| Replenishment oiler
| Rhön
| A1443 
| 1977
|rowspan="2"| 14,169 tonnes
|rowspan="2"| Replacement planned for 2025-2026
|-
| Spessart
| A1442 
| 1977
|-
!rowspan="6"| Elbe
|rowspan="6"| 
|rowspan="6"| Tender
| Elbe
| A511 
| 1993
|rowspan="6"| 3,586 tonnes
|rowspan="6"| 
|-
| Mosel
| A512 
| 1993
|-
| Rhein
| A513 
| 1993
|-
| Werra
| A514 
| 1993
|-
| Main
| A515 
| 1994
|-
| Donau
| A516 
| 1994

|-
! colspan="8" style="background: lavender;"| Tugboats (10 in service)
|-
!rowspan="2"| Wangerooge
|rowspan="2"| 
|rowspan="2"| Ocean tugboat
| Wangerooge
| A1451 
| 1968
|rowspan="2"| 798 tonnes
|rowspan="2"| 
|-
| Spiekeroog
| A1452 
| 1968
|-
! Helgoland
| 
| Salvage tugboat
| Fehmarn
| A1458 
| 1967
| 1,310 tonnes
| 
|-
!rowspan="6"| Nordstrand
|rowspan="6"| 
|rowspan="6"| Harbour tugboat
| Nordstrand
| Y817 
| 1987
|rowspan="6"| 
|rowspan="6"| 
|-
| Langeness
| Y819 
| 1987
|-
| Vogelsand
| Y816 
| 1987
|-
| Lütje Hörn
| Y812 
| 1990
|-
| Scharhörn
| Y815 
| 1990
|-
| Knechtsand
| Y814 
| 1990
|-
! Warnow
| 
| Tugboat
| Warnow
| Y1659 
| 
| 
| 

|-
! colspan="8" style="background: lavender;"| Miscellaneous (9 in service)
|-
!rowspan="3"| Oste
|rowspan="3"| 
|rowspan="3"| Electronic surveillance
| Oste
| A52 
| 1988
|rowspan="3"| 3,200 tonnes
|rowspan="3"| Replacement planned for 2027
|-
| Oker
| A53 
| 1988
|-
| Alster
| A50 
| 1989
|-
!rowspan="2"| Bottsand 
|rowspan="2"| 
|rowspan="2"| Pollution control
| Bottsand
| Y1643 
| 1984
|rowspan="2"| 650 tonnes
|rowspan="2"| 
|-
| Eversand
| Y1644 
| 1987
|-
!rowspan="2"| Schwedeneck
|rowspan="2"| 
|rowspan="2"| Trials ship
| Kronsort
| Y861 
| 1987
|rowspan="2"| 1,000 tonnes
|rowspan="2"| 
|-
| Helmsand
| Y862 
| 1988
|-
! Planet'| 
| Research ship
| Planet
| A1437 
| 2005
| 3,500 tonnes
| 
|-
! Gorch Fock| 
| Sail training ship
| Gorch Fock
| A60 
| 1958
| 1,760 tonnes
|  
|}

See also

Currently active military equipment by countryKampfschwimmer'', combat divers/combat swimmers
List of ships of the German navies
List of ship classes of the Bundesmarine and Deutsche Marine

References

External links
 Official Website of German Navy in English
 Die Flotte 2006 - official fleet listing and presentation in German and English

Bundeswehr
 
Germany, Ships
Germany
Ships